The iodine–starch test is a chemical reaction that is used to test for the presence of starch or for iodine. The combination of starch and iodine is intensely blue-black.
The interaction between starch and the triiodide anion is the basis for iodometry.

History and principles
The iodine–starch test was first described by J. J. Colin and H. F. Gaultier de Claubry, and independently by F. Stromeyer, in 1814.

The triiodide anion instantly produces an intense blue-black colour upon contact with starch. The intensity of the colour decreases with increasing temperature and with the presence of water-miscible organic solvents such as ethanol. The test cannot be performed at very low pH due to the hydrolysis of the starch under these conditions. It is thought that the iodine–iodide mixture combines with the starch to form an infinite polyiodide homopolymer. This was rationalized through single crystal X-ray crystallography and comparative Raman spectroscopy.

Starch as an indicator

Starch is often used in chemistry as an indicator for redox titrations where triiodide is present. Starch forms a very dark blue-black complex with triiodide. However, the complex is not formed if only iodine or only iodide (I−) is present. The colour of the starch complex is so deep, that it can be detected visually when the concentration of the iodine is as low as 20 µM at 20 °C. During iodine titrations, concentrated iodine solutions must be reacted with some titrant, often thiosulfate, in order to remove most of the iodine before the starch is added. This is due to the insolubility of the starch–triiodide complex which may prevent some of the iodine reacting with the titrant. Close to the endpoint, the starch is added, and the titration process is resumed taking into account the amount of thiosulfate added before adding the starch.

The color change can be used to detect moisture or perspiration, as in the Minor test or starch–iodine test.

See also
Lugol's iodine
Counterfeit banknote detection pen

References

Further reading
Vogel's Textbook of Quantitative Chemical Analysis, 5th edition.

External links
How does starch indicate iodine? General Chemistry Online
Iodine test at Braukaiser
Titrations.info: Potentiometric titration--Solutions used in iodometric titrations

Chemical tests
Laboratory techniques
Iodine
Polyhalides
Starch